Anti-Semitism in the 21st Century: The Resurgence is a documentary film that first aired on PBS on January 8, 2007. Directed, produced, and written by Andrew Goldberg, this documentary, hosted by Judy Woodruff, examines the roots of  modern antisemitism and why it flourishes today. The program explores why attacks on Jews in Europe have more than doubled since the 1990s, and its connections to the Arab–Israeli conflict.

The purpose of the program is to explore the origins of antisemitism and why it has surged in recent times. It mainly focuses on antisemitism in the Muslim world and its connections to the Israeli–Palestinian conflict. It explores the history of Islamic antisemitism from pre-Zionism as well as how it has grown since the creation of Israel. The film also explores the similarities between modern Muslim antisemitism and antisemitism in Europe before World War II.

Notes

External links
 WGBH programs- entry on  Anti-Semitism in the 21st Century: The Resurgence
 
 Shop PBS sales- entry for the documentary
 Jewish Journal.com review
 FILM REVIEW: "Anti-Semitism in the 21st Century: The Resurgence" by CAMERA
 New York Times review
 Trailer to the documentary
 Two Cats Productions entry on the documentary

American documentary films
Islam and antisemitism
Documentary films about the Arab–Israeli conflict
2007 television films
2007 films
2007 documentary films
Films directed by Andrew Goldberg
Documentary films about antisemitism
2000s American films